Fonston is a hamlet  north-west of Launceston in Cornwall, England.

References

Hamlets in Cornwall